The 6th World Championships in Athletics, under the auspices of the International Amateur Athletic Federation, were held at the Olympic Stadium, Athens, Greece between August 1 and August 10, 1997. In this event participated 1882 athletes from 198 participant nations.  Athens used the successful organization of the World Championships the next month during the IOC Session in Lausanne during its campaign to host the 2004 Summer Olympics as proof positive of Athens' and Greece's ability and readiness to organize large-scale, international sporting events.

It was the first edition to award wild cards to defending champions even if they did not qualify for their national team. This allowed four athletes from the same country to compete in an individual event in some cases.

Men's results

Track
1993 | 1995 | 1997 | 1999 | 2001

Note: * Indicates athletes who ran in preliminary rounds.
 The United States (Jerome Young, Antonio Pettigrew, Chris Jones, and Tyree Washington) originally won the 4 × 400 m relay in 2:56.47, but were disqualified in 2009 after Antonio Pettigrew admitted to using HGH and EPO between 1997 and 2003.

Field
1993 | 1995 | 1997 | 1999 | 2001

 Aleksandr Bagach of Ukraine originally won the shot put with 21.47 m, but was disqualified after he tested positive for steroids.

Women's results

Track
1993 | 1995 | 1997 | 1999 | 2001

Note: * Indicates athletes who ran in preliminary rounds.

Field
1993 | 1995 | 1997 | 1999 | 2001

Medal table

References

 IAAF 1997

 
World Athletics Championships
International athletics competitions hosted by Greece
Sports competitions in Athens
World Championships in Athletics
World Championships
World Championships in Athletics
1990s in Athens
Athletics in Athens